The American Topical Association (ATA) is a US-based philatelic society  and the largest organization devoted to topical stamp collecting. It was established in 1949 in Milwaukee, Wisconsin by Jerome (Jerry) Husak. It currently serves members in over 60 countries. ATA publishes Topical Time, its bimonthly journal. It also publishes numerous handbooks and maintains many checklists listing hundreds of stamps by topic. The organization runs the National Topical Stamp Show as well as supporting 50+ study units on various topics and 40+ local chapters.

The American Topical Association is an affiliate of the American Philatelic Society.

Member Services
The ATA offers a variety of member services to Topical Collectors so they may enjoy the hobby of Topical
Stamp collecting to the fullest extent. The ATA's office is located in Greer, South Carolina.  Among the services included in annual dues payment are:

Six bi-monthly issues of Topical Time.  Topical Time is the official journal of the American Topical Association, a 92-page bi-monthly publication. The journal includes illustrated and informative topical articles, checklists and dealer advertising. Among the regular features in Topical Time are: "Topics on Postmarks," "Chapter Chatter," and "Units in Action" and at least one multi-page feature article.
Topical Time is available in print and digital formats.
The ability to participate in one of the many Chapters of the ATA.  American Topical Association Chapters are geographical stamp clubs who have affiliated with the ATA. These chapters meet throughout the United States. There are currently 40 chapters, including 5 Canadian and 4 international chapters located in Australia, Great Britain and South Africa. For a complete list of ATA Chapters.
Specific Topical Study Units.  The American Topical Association is composed of members who specialize in thematic or topical philatelic collecting. Those who share a specific topic band together to form "study units." These units promote their specific topic and encourage research on that topic. The topics of study cover a wide range of areas from Americana  on Stamps of the world to Wine on worldwide stamps.
for a complete list of ~50 current study units.
Handbooks.  Handbooks play a vital role in making available to the topical collector research guides on various specific topics. The 
information for the handbooks have been researched and collated in some cases by members of some of the Topical Study units. This 
information is then made available in printed or digital form by the ATA.
Checklists Service The ATA provides Checklist for hundreds of topics large and small, popular and little known areas of interest. They run from A (i.e. abacus, acrobatics, actors on stamps) to Z (zebras, zinnias, zoos on stamps). For each stamp listed the following is given:
Topic, Country, date of issue, denomination, Scott catalogue number, brief description, and non Scott number if known.  Checklists supplement the ATA handbooks an particular topics. The handbook serves as a reference item while
the checklist is a spreadsheet for collectors to use when shopping at dealer booths at stamp shows or on the internet.

Distinguished Topical Philatelist Service Award

The Distinguished Topical Philatelist (DTP) is the highest service award offered by the ATA  and is given for service to topical philately in general and to the ATA in particular. It was established in 1952 by ATA's founder Jerry Husak and has been presented to over 120 individuals, including residents of Canada, Great Britain, Italy, and the United States, since its inception. This is the most prestigious award given by the ATA. The first Distinguished Topical Philatelist award was presented to Allyn H Wright in 1952. The annual award ceremony is held during the ATA's National Topical Stamp Show.

ATA's National Topical Stamp Show

This ATA-sponsored annual show features an all-thematic philatelic exhibition and a 30+ dealer bourse offering a variety of philatelic material for collectors. In addition several cachet makers offer their distinctive and unique covers. There are also many meetings, seminars, youth activities, free stamp appraisals and special touring events. The picture below is of the ATA table at New York 2016 World Stamp Show Exhibition which was held at the Javits Convention Center in New York City. Vera Felts, the previous Executive Director of the ATA, can be seen on the left side of the photo.

References

External links
 
 

Philatelic organizations based in the United States
Organizations established in 1949
Topical postage stamps
1949 establishments in the United States